Paraclemensia cyanea is a moth of the family Incurvariidae. It is found on the main island (Honshu) of Japan.

The wingspan is 12 mm. The forewings are dark brown with a metallic blue lustre.

The larvae possibly feed on Betula platyphylla var. japonica.

References

Moths described in 1982
Incurvariidae
Moths of Japan